Terence Christian (born 8 May 1960) is an English broadcaster, journalist and author. He has presented several national television series in the UK including Channel 4's late night entertainment show The Word (1990–1995) and six series of ITV1 moral issues talk show It's My Life (2003–2008). He has also been a regular guest panelist on the topical Channel 5 series The Wright Stuff and Jeremy Vine.

Christian presented two series of Turn On Terry with regular guest Tony Wilson and numerous other programmes for ITV, MTV, VH1, Channel 4 as well as a variety of different local and national radio programmes on stations including BBC Radio 4, BBC Radio 6 Music, Talksport, Century Radio, Key 103, Signal and BBC Radio Derby and BBC Radio Manchester. While at Radio Derby he won two Sony Awards.

Biography

Early life
Christian grew up in the Brooks Bar neighbourhood of Old Trafford with five brothers and sisters and Irish parents from Dublin: Daniel Christian and Margaret Christian (née Cullen). One of his siblings died when Christian was aged two. The family was sufficiently impoverished that he qualified for free meals at school.

Christian was educated at St Alphonsus' RC Primary School, Ayres Road, Old Trafford, and St Bede's College, Manchester. His father operated a fork-lift truck at Esso in Trafford Park. He attended Thames Polytechnic (now the University of Greenwich) in London but was removed from his biology course due to his poor attendance.

He first appeared on national TV in 1981 with other unemployed youngsters from inner-city areas of Manchester on Devil's Advocate, a Granada Television programme made for ITV by the World In Action team, presented by former World in Action editor Gus Macdonald and produced by Geoff Moore. The show was made in reaction to the Scarman report which looked into the causes of that summer's riots in Moss Side in Manchester, Toxteth in Liverpool, Brixton in London, Handsworth in Birmingham and St Pauls in Bristol. Other contributing youngsters on Devil's Advocate included Johnny Marr of the Smiths. As a result of his appearances on the programme, Christian was offered his own radio show on BBC Radio Derby called Barbed Wireless.

Radio
Christian presented Barbed Wireless between 1982 and 1988 at BBC Radio Derby. The show won Sony Awards in the Best Specialist Music category in 1985 and again in 1986. He also contributed regularly to Saturday Live on BBC Radio 1. From 1986 to 1988 he presented Radio 4's programme Wavelength, which became Wavelength Plus or WPFM, on which Jo Whiley was his researcher.

Christian managed a twelve-piece reggae band from the Derby/Nottingham area, Junior C Reaction, who received airplay on John Peel and Janice Long's shows on BBC Radio 1 for their first independent release on Centurion Records, a double A Side, "Cry Jahoviah", and "Love & Emotion". They were signed to Cooltempo, a Chrysalis subsidiary, and enjoyed a modicum of success with their first release, a version of the Delroy Wilson classic "Better Must Come", which was C-listed on Radio 1 and Capital Radio at the time, as well as playing a live session on Radio One's Saturday Live. Christian also promoted concerts around the Derby and Nottingham area, and regular house nights at Derby's Twentieth Century club, where the resident Saturday-night DJ was Graeme Park.

In late 1988, Christian joined Piccadilly Radio's Key 103 FM, presenting weekday evenings and Sunday afternoon. Christian also wrote "The Word" page in the Manchester Evening News from September 1989, dedicated to the Manchester music scene.

Christian has presented on every radio station in the Manchester area and several across the North West, including Century Radio, where he presented a syndicated evening show across the network. He also presented the breakfast and drivetime show on BBC Radio Manchester, and the same station's Manchester Music Show in 2002, featuring old and new bands from the Manchester area. He then went on to host the breakfast show on BBC Radio Manchester in April 2006. He was also the presenter of The Final Whistle on talkSPORT on Saturday evenings from 2006 until 2008, alongside ex-footballer Micky Quinn.

Christian joined Stockport-based radio station Imagine FM (104.9 FM) in March 2011.

Christian has presented Pick of the Week on BBC Radio 4 as well as With Great Pleasure and A Good Read and appeared on The News Quiz and Chain Reaction, with his KFM colleague Caroline Aherne.

Television
In 1990, with the explosion of the Madchester scene, Christian was recruited to host the Channel 4 youth entertainment show The Word, based on the format of his music magazine radio shows. The show was a mixture of pop music and teen attitude. The Word hosted many groups playing live for the first time on British TV. Christian remained its only continuous presenter until it finished its run in 1995.

He went on to present Carlton Television's The Big City, Sky 1's pop music show The Hitmix, and The Football Show for Tyne Tees Television. He presented Turn on Terry for ITV with regular guest Tony Wilson and six series of Moore Television's It's My Life (2003–2009). "It's My Life" was nominated for two St Martin's Trust Awards.

Christian appeared as himself in the Cribs' video for the stand-alone single "You're Gonna Lose Us", which was made to look like an episode of The Word; and also played the part of Ross Peagrum, despotic TV presenter, in series 2 and 4 of the BBC TV drama series Cutting It. He appeared as a guest on other TV shows in the UK and Ireland. During the '90s, Terry was also regularly seen as a presenter on MTV Europe. In January 2009 he entered as a contestant on the sixth series of Celebrity Big Brother alongside Verne Troyer, La Toya Jackson, Ulrika Jonsson, Coolio and Mutya Buena, finishing in second place. Christian has ITV's youth discussion show It's My Life, made by Manchester-based independent Moore Television. The programme is filmed at Granada Television in Manchester.

Christian turned to stand-up comedy with his one-man show Naked Confessions of a Recovering Catholic, which was well received. Since 2009 he has been a regular panellist on The Wright Stuff on Channel 5 and its replacement Jeremy Vine.

Writing
Christian has been writing articles and columns for newspapers since 1983 and is a regular columnist in the Sunday People and has contributed to other British newspapers. He has also had regular columns in the Daily Sport, Manchester Evening News and the Derby Evening Telegraph and written articles for magazines like Rolling Stone and New York Rocker.

He has also written three books: Brothers – from Childhood to Oasis;  Reds in the Hood (1999), about his early life growing up in Old Trafford; and My Word, a look at the world of television in the 1990s, published in June 2007.

Personal life
Christian considers himself to be ethnically Irish, although of British nationality.

Politics
Christian publicly opposed Brexit, saying on television that the campaign was "based on lies", arguing that a "no-deal Brexit" was "undeliverable" and trusting Boris Johnson was like trusting "the captain of the Titanic to crash into the iceberg".

References

External links
 

Living people
English people of Irish descent
English radio DJs
English television presenters
People educated at St Bede's College, Manchester
People from Old Trafford
1960 births